The  was a radio broadcast of surrender given by Japanese Emperor Hirohito (Shōwa) on August 15, 1945. It announced to the Japanese people that the Japanese Government had accepted the Potsdam Declaration demanding the unconditional surrender of the Japanese military at the end of World War II. Following the Hiroshima bombing on August 6, the Soviet declaration of war and the Nagasaki bombing on August 9, the Emperor's speech was broadcast at noon Japan Standard Time on August 15, 1945, and referred to the atomic bombs as a reason for the surrender.

The speech is the first known instance of an Emperor of Japan speaking to the common people (albeit via a phonograph record). It was delivered in formal Classical Japanese, with much pronunciation unfamiliar to ordinary Japanese. The speech made no direct reference to a surrender of Japan, instead stating that the government had been instructed to accept the "joint declaration" of the United States, the United Kingdom, China and the USSR (the latter power having joined the declaration upon declaring war on Japan). This confused many listeners not familiar with the declaration about whether Japan had actually surrendered. Both the poor audio quality of the radio broadcast and the formal courtly language worsened the confusion. A digitally-remastered version of the broadcast was released in June 2015.

Recording 
The speech was not broadcast directly, but replayed from a phonograph recording. On August 14, 1945, the NHK dispatched sound technicians to the Imperial Palace to record the broadcast.  Microphones were set up in an office bunker under the Imperial Household Ministry, and Emperor Hirohito proceeded in between 11:25p.m. and 11:30p.m. During the first recording he spoke too softly, and upon the advice of the technicians, offered to rerecord it. On the second attempt, his voice was considered too high pitched, with occasional characters being skipped. Nevertheless, the second version was deemed the official one, with the first serving as a backup.

Broadcast 

Many elements of the Imperial Japanese Army refused to accept that the emperor was going to end the war, believing it dishonourable. As many as 1,000 officers and soldiers raided the Imperial Palace on the evening of August 14, 1945 to destroy the recording. The rebels were confused by the layout of the palace and were unable to find the recordings, which had been hidden in a pile of documents. The two phonographs were labelled original and copy and successfully smuggled out of the palace, the original in a lacquer box and the copy in a lunch bag. Major Kenji Hatanaka attempted to halt the broadcast at the NHK station but was ordered to desist by the Eastern District Army.

On the morning of August 15, 1945, all NHK stations announced that the Emperor would address the nation at noon. Many of the people wore formal clothes for the occasion. At precisely noon that day, an NHK announcer instructed the nation to stand for an announcement "of the highest importance." The national anthem, was played, followed by the Emperor's speech. Reportedly, this was the first time that common Japanese had heard the voice of any Japanese emperor and the first radio address by the emperor.

To ease the anticipated confusion, after the conclusion of the speech, a radio announcer clarified that the Emperor's message had meant that Japan was surrendering. According to French journalist Robert Guillain, who then lived in Tokyo, upon the announcement's conclusion, most Japanese retreated to their homes or places of business for several hours to quietly absorb and contemplate the significance of the announcement.

Content 

Though the word "surrender" was not explicitly stated, the emperor instructed his government to communicate to the Allies that the "empire accepts the provisions of their joint declaration", which amounted to an acceptance of the Potsdam Declaration. He justified Japan's decision to go to war as an act of "self-preservation and the stabilization of East Asia" and referenced the setbacks and defeats of recent years, saying "the war situation has developed not necessarily to Japan's advantage". He mentioned the atomic bombings of Hiroshima and Nagasaki that had occurred days earlier, calling the atomic bomb a "new and most cruel bomb". The emperor ended with a call on the Japanese people "to be devoted to construction for the future".

The broadcast was translated into English and broadcast internationally by radio presenter Tadaichi Hirakawa at the same time. In the U.S., the Federal Communications Commission (FCC) recorded the broadcast, and its entire text appeared in The New York Times.

Full text

Media releases

Notes

See also
 Humanity Declaration

References

External links 

 Audio recording of entire speech, in Japanese
 Photo containing English text of the Emperor's declaration
 Proclamation Defining Terms for Japanese Surrender Issued, at Potsdam, July 26, 1945
 The Emperor's Speech: 67 Years Ago, Hirohito Transformed Japan Forever, The Atlantic, August 15, 2012

August 1945 events in Asia
1945 in Japan
1945 in radio
1945 speeches
Hirohito
Japan in World War II
Rescripts
Surrender of Japan
World War II speeches
1945 in military history
Japanese Imperial rescripts